Sheep Mountain is a  elevation summit located  northeast of Palmer in the southern Talkeetna Mountains of the U.S. state of Alaska. This landmark is set midway between Palmer and Glennallen, with the Glenn Highway traversing the southern base of this mountain at mile 113. The mountain's local name was reported in 1906 by U.S. Geological Survey. It is called Beznae, meaning "(a type of) Stone", in the Ahtna language.

Climate

Based on the Köppen climate classification, Sheep Mountain is located in a subarctic climate zone with long, cold, snowy winters, and mild summers. Temperatures can drop below −20 °C with wind chill factors below −30 °C. The months May through June offer the most favorable weather for climbing or viewing. Precipitation runoff from the mountain drains into tributaries of the Matanuska River.

See also

Matanuska Formation
Geography of Alaska

References

Gallery

External links
 Weather forecast: Sheep Mountain

Mountains of Alaska
Landforms of Matanuska-Susitna Borough, Alaska
Mountains of Matanuska-Susitna Borough, Alaska